The General Dynamics F-16 Fighting Falcon is an American single-engine multirole fighter aircraft originally developed by General Dynamics for the United States Air Force (USAF). Designed as an air superiority day fighter, it evolved into a successful all-weather multirole aircraft. Over 4,600 aircraft have been built since production was approved in 1976. Although no longer being purchased by the U.S. Air Force, improved versions are being built for export customers. In 1993, General Dynamics sold its aircraft manufacturing business to the Lockheed Corporation, which in turn became part of Lockheed Martin after a 1995 merger with Martin Marietta.

The Fighting Falcon's key features include a frameless bubble canopy for good visibility, side-mounted control stick to ease control while maneuvering, an ejection seat reclined 30 degrees from vertical to reduce the effect of g-forces on the pilot, and the first use of a relaxed static stability/fly-by-wire flight control system that helps to make it an agile aircraft. The F-16 has an internal M61 Vulcan cannon and 11 locations for mounting weapons and other mission equipment. The F-16's official name is "Fighting Falcon", but "Viper" is commonly used by its pilots and crews, because of a perceived resemblance to a viper snake as well as to the fictional Colonial Viper starfighter from the television program Battlestar Galactica which aired at the time the F-16 entered service.

In addition to active duty in the U.S. Air Force, Air Force Reserve Command, and Air National Guard units, the aircraft is also used by the U.S. Air Force Thunderbirds aerial demonstration team, and as an adversary/aggressor aircraft by the United States Navy. The F-16 has also been procured to serve in the air forces of 25 other nations. As of 2015, it was the world's most numerous fixed-wing aircraft in military service.

Development

Lightweight Fighter program

Experiences in the Vietnam War revealed the need for air superiority fighters and better air-to-air training for fighter pilots. Based on his experiences in the Korean War and as a fighter tactics instructor in the early 1960s, Colonel John Boyd with mathematician Thomas Christie developed the energy–maneuverability theory to model a fighter aircraft's performance in combat. Boyd's work called for a small, lightweight aircraft that could maneuver with the minimum possible energy loss and which also incorporated an increased thrust-to-weight ratio. In the late 1960s, Boyd gathered a group of like-minded innovators who became known as the Fighter Mafia, and in 1969, they secured Department of Defense funding for General Dynamics and Northrop to study design concepts based on the theory.

Air Force F-X proponents remained hostile to the concept because they perceived it as a threat to the F-15 program, but the USAF's leadership understood that its budget would not allow it to purchase enough F-15 aircraft to satisfy all of its missions. The Advanced Day Fighter concept, renamed F-XX, gained civilian political support under the reform-minded Deputy Secretary of Defense David Packard, who favored the idea of competitive prototyping. As a result, in May 1971, the Air Force Prototype Study Group was established, with Boyd a key member, and two of its six proposals would be funded, one being the Lightweight Fighter (LWF). This was the region where USAF studies predicted most future air combat would occur. The anticipated average flyaway cost of a production version was $3 million. This production plan, though, was only notional, as the USAF had no firm plans to procure the winner.

Selection of finalists and flyoff

Five companies responded, and in 1972, the Air Staff selected General Dynamics' Model 401 and Northrop's P-600 for the follow-on prototype development and testing phase. GD and Northrop were awarded contracts worth $37.9 million and $39.8 million to produce the YF-16 and YF-17, respectively, with the first flights of both prototypes planned for early 1974. To overcome resistance in the Air Force hierarchy, the Fighter Mafia and other LWF proponents successfully advocated the idea of complementary fighters in a high-cost/low-cost force mix. The "high/low mix" would allow the USAF to be able to afford sufficient fighters for its overall fighter force structure requirements. The mix gained broad acceptance by the time of the prototypes' flyoff, defining the relationship of the LWF and the F-15.

The YF-16 was developed by a team of General Dynamics engineers led by Robert H. Widmer. The first YF-16 was rolled out on 13 December 1973. Its 90-minute maiden flight was made at the Air Force Flight Test Center at Edwards AFB, California, on 2 February 1974. Its actual first flight occurred accidentally during a high-speed taxi test on 20 January 1974. While gathering speed, a roll-control oscillation caused a fin of the port-side wingtip-mounted missile and then the starboard stabilator to scrape the ground, and the aircraft then began to veer off the runway. The test pilot, Phil Oestricher, decided to lift off to avoid a potential crash, safely landing six minutes later. The slight damage was quickly repaired and the official first flight occurred on time. The YF-16's first supersonic flight was accomplished on 5 February 1974, and the second YF-16 prototype first flew on 9 May 1974. This was followed by the first flights of Northrop's YF-17 prototypes on 9 June and 21 August 1974, respectively. During the fly off, the YF-16s completed 330 sorties for a total of 417 flight hours; the YF-17s flew 288 sorties, covering 345 hours.

Air Combat Fighter competition
Increased interest turned the LWF into a serious acquisition program. NATO allies Belgium, Denmark, the Netherlands, and Norway were seeking to replace their F-104G Starfighter fighter-bombers. In early 1974, they reached an agreement with the U.S. that if the USAF ordered the LWF winner, they would consider ordering it as well. The USAF also needed to replace its F-105 Thunderchief and F-4 Phantom II fighter-bombers. The U.S. Congress sought greater commonality in fighter procurements by the Air Force and Navy, and in August 1974 redirected Navy funds to a new Navy Air Combat Fighter program that would be a navalized fighter-bomber variant of the LWF. The four NATO allies had formed the Multinational Fighter Program Group (MFPG) and pressed for a U.S. decision by December 1974; thus, the USAF accelerated testing.

To reflect this serious intent to procure a new fighter-bomber, the LWF program was rolled into a new Air Combat Fighter (ACF) competition in an announcement by U.S. Secretary of Defense James R. Schlesinger in April 1974. The ACF would not be a pure fighter, but multi-role, and Schlesinger made it clear that any ACF order would be in addition to the F-15, which extinguished opposition to the LWF. ACF also raised the stakes for GD and Northrop because it brought in competitors intent on securing what was touted at the time as "the arms deal of the century". These were Dassault-Breguet's proposed Mirage F1M-53, the Anglo-French SEPECAT Jaguar, and the proposed Saab 37E "Eurofighter". Northrop offered the P-530 Cobra, which was similar to the YF-17. The Jaguar and Cobra were dropped by the MFPG early on, leaving two European and two U.S. candidates. On 11 September 1974, the U.S. Air Force confirmed plans to order the winning ACF design to equip five tactical fighter wings. Though computer modeling predicted a close contest, the YF-16 proved significantly quicker going from one maneuver to the next and was the unanimous choice of those pilots that flew both aircraft.

On 13 January 1975, Secretary of the Air Force John L. McLucas announced the YF-16 as the winner of the ACF competition. The chief reasons given by the secretary were the YF-16's lower operating costs, greater range, and maneuver performance that was "significantly better" than that of the YF-17, especially at supersonic speeds. Another advantage of the YF-16 – unlike the YF-17 – was its use of the Pratt & Whitney F100 turbofan engine, the same powerplant used by the F-15; such commonality would lower the cost of engines for both programs. Secretary McLucas announced that the USAF planned to order at least 650, possibly up to 1,400 production F-16s. In the Navy Air Combat Fighter competition, on 2 May 1975 the Navy selected the YF-17 as the basis for what would become the McDonnell Douglas F/A-18 Hornet.

Production

The U.S. Air Force initially ordered 15 full-scale development (FSD) aircraft (11 single-seat and four two-seat models) for its flight test program, but was reduced to eight (six F-16A single-seaters and two F-16B two-seaters). The YF-16 design was altered for the production F-16. The F-16's weight was increased by 25% over the YF-16 by these modifications.

The FSD F-16s were manufactured by General Dynamics in Fort Worth, Texas, at United States Air Force Plant 4 in late 1975; the first F-16A rolled out on 20 October 1976 and first flew on 8 December. The initial two-seat model achieved its first flight on 8 August 1977. The initial production-standard F-16A flew for the first time on 7 August 1978 and its delivery was accepted by the USAF on 6 January 1979. The F-16 was given its name of "Fighting Falcon" on 21 July 1980, entering USAF operational service with the 34th Tactical Fighter Squadron, 388th Tactical Fighter Wing, at Hill AFB in Utah, on 1 October 1980.

On 7 June 1975, the four European partners, now known as the European Participation Group, signed up for 348 aircraft at the Paris Air Show. This was split among the European Participation Air Forces (EPAF) as 116 for Belgium, 58 for Denmark, 102 for the Netherlands, and 72 for Norway. Two European production lines, one in the Netherlands at Fokker's Schiphol-Oost facility and the other at SABCA's Gosselies plant in Belgium, would produce 184 and 164 units respectively. Norway's Kongsberg Vaapenfabrikk and Denmark's Terma A/S also manufactured parts and subassemblies for EPAF aircraft. European co-production was officially launched on 1 July 1977 at the Fokker factory. Beginning in November 1977, Fokker-produced components were sent to Fort Worth for fuselage assembly, then shipped back to Europe for final assembly of EPAF aircraft at the Belgian plant on 15 February 1978; deliveries to the Belgian Air Force began in January 1979. The first Royal Netherlands Air Force aircraft was delivered in June 1979. In 1980, the first aircraft were delivered to the Royal Norwegian Air Force by SABCA and to the Royal Danish Air Force by Fokker.

During the late 1980s and 1990s, Turkish Aerospace Industries (TAI) produced 232 Block 30/40/50 F-16s on a production line in Ankara under license for the Turkish Air Force. TAI also produced 46 Block 40s for Egypt in the mid-1990s and 30 Block 50s from 2010. Korean Aerospace Industries opened a production line for the KF-16 program, producing 140 Block 52s from the mid-1990s to mid-2000s (decade). If India had selected the F-16IN for its Medium Multi-Role Combat Aircraft procurement, a sixth F-16 production line would have been built in India. In May 2013, Lockheed Martin stated there were currently enough orders to keep producing the F-16 until 2017.

Improvements and upgrades
One change made during production was augmented pitch control to avoid deep stall conditions at high angles of attack. The stall issue had been raised during development but had originally been discounted. Model tests of the YF-16 conducted by the Langley Research Center revealed a potential problem, but no other laboratory was able to duplicate it. YF-16 flight tests were not sufficient to expose the issue; later flight testing on the FSD aircraft demonstrated a real concern. In response, the area of each horizontal stabilizer was increased by 25% on the Block 15 aircraft in 1981 and later retrofitted to earlier aircraft. In addition, a manual override switch to disable the horizontal stabilizer flight limiter was prominently placed on the control console, allowing the pilot to regain control of the horizontal stabilizers (which the flight limiters otherwise lock in place) and recover. Besides reducing the risk of deep stalls, the larger horizontal tail also improved stability and permitted faster takeoff rotation.

In the 1980s, the Multinational Staged Improvement Program (MSIP) was conducted to evolve the F-16's capabilities, mitigate risks during technology development, and ensure the aircraft's worth. The program upgraded the F-16 in three stages. The MSIP process permitted the quick introduction of new capabilities, at lower costs and with reduced risks compared to traditional independent upgrade programs. In 2012, the USAF had allocated $2.8 billion to upgrade 350 F-16s while waiting for the F-35 to enter service. One key upgrade has been an auto-GCAS (Ground collision avoidance system) to reduce instances of controlled flight into terrain. Onboard power and cooling capacities limit the scope of upgrades, which often involve the addition of more power-hungry avionics.

Lockheed won many contracts to upgrade foreign operators' F-16s. BAE Systems also offers various F-16 upgrades, receiving orders from South Korea, Oman, Turkey, and the US Air National Guard; BAE lost the South Korean contract because of a price breach in November 2014. In 2012, the USAF assigned the total upgrade contract to Lockheed Martin. Upgrades include Raytheon's Center Display Unit, which replaces several analog flight instruments with a single digital display.

In 2013, sequestration budget cuts cast doubt on the USAF's ability to complete the Combat Avionics Programmed Extension Suite (CAPES), a part of secondary programs such as Taiwan's F-16 upgrade. Air Combat Command's General Mike Hostage stated that if he only had money for a service life extension program (SLEP) or CAPES, he would fund SLEP to keep the aircraft flying. Lockheed Martin responded to talk of CAPES cancellation with a fixed-price upgrade package for foreign users. CAPES was not included in the Pentagon's 2015 budget request. The USAF said that the upgrade package will still be offered to Taiwan's Republic of China Air Force, and Lockheed said that some common elements with the F-35 will keep the radar's unit costs down. In 2014, the USAF issued a RFI to SLEP 300 F-16 C/Ds.

Production relocation
To make more room for assembly of its newer F-35 Lightning II fighter aircraft, Lockheed Martin moved the F-16 production from Fort Worth, Texas to its plant in Greenville, South Carolina. Lockheed delivered the last F-16 from Fort Worth to the Iraqi Air Force on 14 November 2017, ending 40 years of F-16 production there. The company resumed production in 2019, though engineering and modernization work will remain in Fort Worth. A gap in orders made it possible to stop production during the move; after completing orders for the last Iraqi purchase, the company was negotiating an F-16 sale to Bahrain that would be produced in Greenville. This contract was signed in June 2018.

Design

Overview

The F-16 is a single-engine, highly maneuverable, supersonic, multi-role tactical fighter aircraft. It is much smaller and lighter than its predecessors but uses advanced aerodynamics and avionics, including the first use of a relaxed static stability/fly-by-wire (RSS/FBW) flight control system, to achieve enhanced maneuver performance. Highly agile, the F-16 was the first fighter aircraft purpose-built to pull 9-g maneuvers and can reach a maximum speed of over Mach 2. Innovations include a frameless bubble canopy for better visibility, a side-mounted control stick, and a reclined seat to reduce g-force effects on the pilot. It is armed with an internal M61 Vulcan cannon in the left wing root and has multiple locations for mounting various missiles, bombs and pods. It has a thrust-to-weight ratio greater than one, providing power to climb and vertical acceleration.

The F-16 was designed to be relatively inexpensive to build and simpler to maintain than earlier-generation fighters. The airframe is built with about 80% aviation-grade aluminum alloys, 8% steel, 3% composites, and 1.5% titanium. The leading-edge flaps, stabilators, and ventral fins make use of bonded aluminum honeycomb structures and graphite epoxy lamination coatings. The number of lubrication points, fuel line connections, and replaceable modules is significantly lower than preceding fighters; 80% of the access panels can be accessed without stands. The air intake was placed so it was rearward of the nose but forward enough to minimize air flow losses and reduce aerodynamic drag.

Although the LWF program called for a structural life of 4,000 flight hours, capable of achieving 7.33 g with 80% internal fuel; GD's engineers decided to design the F-16's airframe life for 8,000 hours and for 9-g maneuvers on full internal fuel. This proved advantageous when the aircraft's mission changed from solely air-to-air combat to multi-role operations. Changes in operational use and additional systems have increased weight, necessitating multiple structural strengthening programs.

General configuration

The F-16 has a cropped-delta wing incorporating wing-fuselage blending and forebody vortex-control strakes; a fixed-geometry, underslung air intake (with splitter plate) to the single turbofan jet engine; a conventional tri-plane empennage arrangement with all-moving horizontal "stabilator" tailplanes; a pair of ventral fins beneath the fuselage aft of the wing's trailing edge; and a tricycle landing gear configuration with the aft-retracting, steerable nose gear deploying a short distance behind the inlet lip. There is a boom-style aerial refueling receptacle located behind the single-piece "bubble" canopy of the cockpit. Split-flap speedbrakes are located at the aft end of the wing-body fairing, and a tailhook is mounted underneath the fuselage. A fairing beneath the rudder often houses ECM equipment or a drag chute. Later F-16 models feature a long dorsal fairing along the fuselage's "spine", housing additional equipment or fuel.

Aerodynamic studies in the 1960s demonstrated that the "vortex lift" phenomenon could be harnessed by highly swept wing configurations to reach higher angles of attack, using leading edge vortex flow off a slender lifting surface. As the F-16 was being optimized for high combat agility, GD's designers chose a slender cropped-delta wing with a leading-edge sweep of 40° and a straight trailing edge. To improve maneuverability, a variable-camber wing with a NACA 64A-204 airfoil was selected; the camber is adjusted by leading-edge and trailing edge flaperons linked to a digital flight control system regulating the flight envelope. The F-16 has a moderate wing loading, reduced by fuselage lift. The vortex lift effect is increased by leading-edge extensions, known as strakes. Strakes act as additional short-span, triangular wings running from the wing root (the junction with fuselage) to a point further forward on the fuselage. Blended into the fuselage and along the wing root, the strake generates a high-speed vortex that remains attached to the top of the wing as the angle of attack increases, generating additional lift and allowing greater angles of attack without stalling. Strakes allow a smaller, lower-aspect-ratio wing, which increases roll rates and directional stability while decreasing weight. Deeper wing roots also increase structural strength and internal fuel volume.

Armament

Early F-16s could be armed with up to six AIM-9 Sidewinder heat-seeking short-range air-to-air missiles (AAM) by employing rail launchers on each wingtip, as well as radar-guided AIM-7 Sparrow medium-range AAMs in a weapons mix. More recent versions support the AIM-120 AMRAAM, and US aircraft often mount that missile on their wingtips to reduce wing flutter. The aircraft can carry various other AAMs, a wide variety of air-to-ground missiles, rockets or bombs; electronic countermeasures (ECM), navigation, targeting or weapons pods; and fuel tanks on 9 hardpoints – six under the wings, two on wingtips, and one under the fuselage. Two other locations under the fuselage are available for sensor or radar pods. The F-16 carries a 20 mm (0.787 in) M61A1 Vulcan cannon, which is mounted inside the fuselage to the left of the cockpit.

Negative stability and fly-by-wire

The F-16 is the first production fighter aircraft intentionally designed to be slightly aerodynamically unstable, also known as relaxed static stability (RSS), to improve maneuverability. Most aircraft are designed with positive static stability, which induces aircraft to return to straight and level flight attitude if the pilot releases the controls; this reduces maneuverability as the inherent stability has to be overcome. Aircraft with negative stability are designed to deviate from controlled flight and are thus more maneuverable. At supersonic speeds the F-16 gains stability (eventually positive) because of aerodynamic changes.

To counter the tendency to depart from controlled flight and avoid the need for constant trim inputs by the pilot, the F-16 has a quadruplex (four-channel) fly-by-wire (FBW) flight control system (FLCS). The flight control computer (FLCC) accepts pilot input from the stick and rudder controls and manipulates the control surfaces in such a way as to produce the desired result without inducing control loss. The FLCC conducts thousands of measurements per second on the aircraft's flight attitude to automatically counter deviations from the pilot-set flight path; leading to a common aphorism among pilots: "You don't fly an F-16; it flies you."

The FLCC further incorporates limiters governing movement in the three main axes based on attitude, airspeed and angle of attack (AOA); these prevent control surfaces from inducing instability such as slips or skids, or a high AOA inducing a stall. The limiters also prevent maneuvers that would exert more than a 9 g load. Flight testing has revealed that "assaulting" multiple limiters at high AOA and low speed can result in an AOA far exceeding the 25° limit, colloquially referred to as "departing"; this causes a deep stall; a near-freefall at 50° to 60° AOA, either upright or inverted. While at a very high AOA, the aircraft's attitude is stable but control surfaces are ineffective. The pitch limiter locks the stabilators at an extreme pitch-up or pitch-down attempting to recover. This can be overridden so the pilot can "rock" the nose via pitch control to recover.

Unlike the YF-17, which had hydromechanical controls serving as a backup to the FBW, General Dynamics took the innovative step of eliminating mechanical linkages from the control stick and rudder pedals to the flight control surfaces. The F-16 is entirely reliant on its electrical systems to relay flight commands, instead of traditional mechanically linked controls, leading to the early moniker of "the electric jet". The quadruplex design permits "graceful degradation" in flight control response in that the loss of one channel renders the FLCS a "triplex" system. The FLCC began as an analog system on the A/B variants but has been supplanted by a digital computer system beginning with the F-16C/D Block 40. The F-16's controls suffered from a sensitivity to static electricity or electrostatic discharge (ESD). Up to 70–80% of the C/D models' electronics were vulnerable to ESD.

Cockpit and ergonomics

A key feature of the F-16's cockpit is the exceptional field of view. The single-piece, bird-proof polycarbonate bubble canopy provides 360° all-round visibility, with a 40° look-down angle over the side of the aircraft, and 15° down over the nose (compared to the common 12–13° of preceding aircraft); the pilot's seat is elevated for this purpose. Furthermore, the F-16's canopy lacks the forward bow frame found on many fighters, which is an obstruction to a pilot's forward vision. The F-16's ACES II zero/zero ejection seat is reclined at an unusual tilt-back angle of 30°; most fighters have a tilted seat at 13–15°. The tilted seat can accommodate taller pilots and increases g-force tolerance; however, it has been associated with reports of neck ache, possibly caused by incorrect head-rest usage. Subsequent U.S. fighters have adopted more modest tilt-back angles of 20°. Because of the seat angle and the canopy's thickness, the ejection seat lacks canopy-breakers for emergency egress; instead the entire canopy is jettisoned prior to the seat's rocket firing.

The pilot flies primarily by means of an armrest-mounted side-stick controller (instead of a traditional center-mounted stick) and an engine throttle; conventional rudder pedals are also employed. To enhance the pilot's degree of control of the aircraft during high-g combat maneuvers, various switches and function controls were moved to centralized hands on throttle-and-stick (HOTAS) controls upon both the controllers and the throttle. Hand pressure on the side-stick controller is transmitted by electrical signals via the FBW system to adjust various flight control surfaces to maneuver the F-16. Originally, the side-stick controller was non-moving, but this proved uncomfortable and difficult for pilots to adjust to, sometimes resulting in a tendency to "over-rotate" during takeoffs, so the control stick was given a small amount of "play". Since the introduction of the F-16, HOTAS controls have become a standard feature on modern fighters.

The F-16 has a head-up display (HUD), which projects visual flight and combat information in front of the pilot without obstructing the view; being able to keep their head "out of the cockpit" improves the pilot's situation awareness. Further flight and systems information are displayed on multi-function displays (MFD). The left-hand MFD is the primary flight display (PFD), typically showing radar and moving-maps; the right-hand MFD is the system display (SD), presenting information about the engine, landing gear, slat and flap settings, and fuel and weapons status. Initially, the F-16A/B had monochrome cathode ray tube (CRT) displays; replaced by color liquid-crystal displays on the Block 50/52. The Mid-life Update (MLU) introduced compatibility with night-vision goggles (NVG). The Boeing Joint Helmet Mounted Cueing System (JHMCS) is available from Block 40 onwards, for targeting based on where the pilot's head faces, unrestricted by the HUD, using high-off-boresight missiles like the AIM-9X.

Fire-control radar
The F-16A/B was originally equipped with the Westinghouse AN/APG-66 fire-control radar. Its slotted planar array antenna was designed to be compact to fit into the F-16's relatively small nose. In uplook mode, the APG-66 uses a low pulse-repetition frequency (PRF) for medium- and high-altitude target detection in a low-clutter environment, and in look-down/shoot-down employs a medium PRF for heavy clutter environments. It has four operating frequencies within the X band, and provides four air-to-air and seven air-to-ground operating modes for combat, even at night or in bad weather. The Block 15's APG-66(V)2 model added a more powerful signal processing, higher output power, improved reliability and increased range in cluttered or jamming environments. The Mid-Life Update (MLU) program introduced a new model, APG-66(V)2A, which features higher speed and more memory.

The AN/APG-68, an evolution of the APG-66, was introduced with the F-16C/D Block 25. The APG-68 has greater range and resolution, as well as 25 operating modes, including ground-mapping, Doppler beam-sharpening, ground moving target indication, sea target, and track while scan (TWS) for up to 10 targets. The Block 40/42's APG-68(V)1 model added full compatibility with Lockheed Martin Low-Altitude Navigation and Targeting Infra-Red for Night (LANTIRN) pods, and a high-PRF pulse-Doppler track mode to provide Interrupted Continuous Wave guidance for semi-active radar-homing (SARH) missiles like the AIM-7 Sparrow. Block 50/52 F-16s initially used the more reliable APG-68(V)5 which has a programmable signal processor employing Very-High-Speed Integrated Circuit (VHSIC) technology. The Advanced Block 50/52 (or 50+/52+) are equipped with the APG-68(V)9 radar, with a 30% greater air-to-air detection range and a synthetic aperture radar (SAR) mode for high-resolution mapping and target detection-recognition. In August 2004, Northrop Grumman was contracted to upgrade the APG-68 radars of Block 40/42/50/52 aircraft to the (V)10 standard, providing all-weather autonomous detection and targeting for Global Positioning System (GPS)-aided precision weapons, SAR mapping and terrain-following radar (TF) modes, as well as interleaving of all modes.

The F-16E/F is outfitted with Northrop Grumman's AN/APG-80 active electronically scanned array (AESA) radar. Northrop Grumman developed the latest AESA radar upgrade for the F-16 (selected for USAF and Taiwan's Republic of China Air Force F-16 upgrades), named the Scalable Agile Beam Radar (SABR) APG-83. In July 2007, Raytheon announced that it was developing a Next Generation Radar (RANGR) based on its earlier AN/APG-79 AESA radar as a competitor to Northrop Grumman's AN/APG-68 and AN/APG-80 for the F-16. On 28 February 2020, Northrop Grumman received an order from USAF to extend the service lives of their F-16s to at least 2048 with APG-83 Scalable Agile Beam Radar (SABR) as part of the service-life extension program (SLEP).

Propulsion

The initial powerplant selected for the single-engined F-16 was the Pratt & Whitney F100-PW-200 afterburning turbofan, a modified version of the F-15's F100-PW-100, rated at 23,830 lbf (106.0 kN) thrust. During testing, the engine was found to be prone to compressor stalls and "rollbacks", wherein the engine's thrust would spontaneously reduce to idle. Until resolved, the Air Force ordered F-16s to be operated within "dead-stick landing" distance of its bases. It was the standard F-16 engine through the Block 25, except for the newly built Block 15s with the Operational Capability Upgrade (OCU). The OCU introduced the 23,770 lbf (105.7 kN) F100-PW-220, later installed on Block 32 and 42 aircraft: the main advance being a Digital Electronic Engine Control (DEEC) unit, which improved reliability and reduced stall occurrence. Beginning production in 1988, the "-220" also supplanted the F-15's "-100", for commonality. Many of the "-220" engines on Block 25 and later aircraft were upgraded from 1997 onwards to the "-220E" standard, which enhanced reliability and maintainability; unscheduled engine removals were reduced by 35%.

The F100-PW-220/220E was the result of the USAF's Alternate Fighter Engine (AFE) program (colloquially known as "the Great Engine War"), which also saw the entry of General Electric as an F-16 engine provider. Its F110-GE-100 turbofan was limited by the original inlet to thrust of 25,735 lbf (114.5 kN), the Modular Common Inlet Duct allowed the F110 to achieve its maximum thrust of 28,984 lbf (128.9 kN). (To distinguish between aircraft equipped with these two engines and inlets, from the Block 30 series on, blocks ending in "0" (e.g., Block 30) are powered by GE, and blocks ending in "2" (e.g., Block 32) are fitted with Pratt & Whitney engines.)

The Increased Performance Engine (IPE) program led to the 29,588 lbf (131.6 kN) F110-GE-129 on the Block 50 and 29,160 lbf (129.4 kN) F100-PW-229 on the Block 52. F-16s began flying with these IPE engines in the early 1990s. Altogether, of the 1,446 F-16C/Ds ordered by the USAF, 556 were fitted with F100-series engines and 890 with F110s. The United Arab Emirates' Block 60 is powered by the General Electric F110-GE-132 turbofan with a maximum thrust of 32,500 lbf (144.6 kN), the highest thrust engine developed for the F-16.

Operational history

F-16s have participated in numerous conflicts, most of them in the Middle East.

United States
The F-16 is being used by the active duty USAF, Air Force Reserve, and Air National Guard units, the USAF aerial demonstration team, the U.S. Air Force Thunderbirds, and as an adversary-aggressor aircraft by the United States Navy at the Naval Strike and Air Warfare Center.

The U.S. Air Force, including the Air Force Reserve and the Air National Guard, flew the F-16 in combat during Operation Desert Storm in 1991 and in the Balkans later in the 1990s. F-16s also patrolled the no-fly zones in Iraq during Operations Northern Watch and Southern Watch and served during the War in Afghanistan and the War in Iraq from 2001 and 2003 respectively. In 2011, Air Force F-16s took part in the intervention in Libya.

On 11 September 2001, two unarmed F-16s were launched in an attempt to ram and down United Airlines Flight 93 before it reached Washington D.C. during the 11 September 2001, terrorist attacks, but Flight 93 was brought down by the passengers first, so the F-16s were retasked to patrol the local airspace and later escorted Air Force 1 back to Washington.

The F-16 had been scheduled to remain in service with the U.S. Air Force until 2025. Its replacement was planned to be the F-35A variant of the Lockheed Martin F-35 Lightning II, which is expected to gradually begin replacing several multi-role aircraft among the program's member nations. However, owing to delays in the F-35 program, all USAF F-16s will receive service life extension upgrades. In 2022, it was announced the USAF would continue to operate the F-16 for another two decades.

Israel

The F-16's first air-to-air combat success was achieved by the Israeli Air Force (IAF) over the Bekaa Valley on 28 April 1981, against a Syrian Mi-8 helicopter, which was downed with cannon fire. On 7 June 1981, eight Israeli F-16s, escorted by six F-15s, executed Operation Opera, their first employment in a significant air-to-ground operation. This raid severely damaged Osirak, an Iraqi nuclear reactor under construction near Baghdad, to prevent the regime of Saddam Hussein from using the reactor for the creation of nuclear weapons.

The following year, during the 1982 Lebanon War Israeli F-16s engaged Syrian aircraft in one of the largest air battles involving jet aircraft, which began on 9 June and continued for two more days. Israeli Air Force F-16s were credited with 44 air-to-air kills during the conflict.

In January 2000, Israel completed a purchase of 102 new F-16I aircraft in a deal totaling $4.5 billion. F-16s were also used in their ground-attack role for strikes against targets in Lebanon. IAF F-16s participated in the 2006 Lebanon War and the 2008–09 Gaza War. During and after the 2006 Lebanon war, IAF F-16s shot down Iranian-made UAVs launched by Hezbollah, using Rafael Python 5 air-to-air missiles.

On 10 February 2018, an Israeli Air Force F-16I was shot down in northern Israel when it was hit by a relatively old model S-200 (NATO name SA-5 Gammon) surface-to-air missile of the Syrian Air Defense Force. The pilot and navigator ejected safely in Israeli territory. The F-16I was part of a bombing mission against Syrian and Iranian targets around Damascus after an Iranian drone entered Israeli air space and was shot down. An Israel Air Force investigation determined on 27 February 2018 that the loss was due to pilot error since the IAF determined the air crew did not adequately defend themselves.

Pakistan

During the Soviet–Afghan War, PAF F-16As shot down between 20-30 Soviet & Afghan warplanes however the political situation resulted in PAF officially recognising only 9 kills which were made inside Pakistani airspace.
From May 1986 to January 1989, PAF F-16s from the Tail Choppers and Griffin squadrons using mostly AIM-9 Sidewinder missiles, shot down four Afghan Su-22s, two MiG-23s, one Su-25, and one An-26s. Most of these kills were by missiles, but at least one, a Su-22, was destroyed by cannon fire. One F-16 was lost in these battles.

On 7 June 2002, a Pakistan Air Force F-16B Block 15 (S. No. 82-605) shot down an Indian Air Force unmanned aerial vehicle, an Israeli-made Searcher II, using an AIM-9L Sidewinder missile, during a night interception near Lahore

The Pakistan Air Force has used its F-16s in various foreign and internal military exercises, such as the "Indus Vipers" exercise in 2008 conducted jointly with Turkey.

More than 80% of the dropped munitions were laser-guided bombs.

On 27 February 2019, following six Pakistan Air Force airstrikes in Indian administered Kashmir, Pakistani officials said that two of its fighter jets shot down one MiG-21 and one Su-30MKI belonging to the Indian Air Force. Indian officials only confirmed the loss of one MiG-21 but denied losing any Su-30MKI in the clash. Additionally Indian officials also claimed to have shot down one F-16 belonging to Pakistan air force. This was denied by the Pakistani side, considered dubious by neutral sources, and later backed by a report by Foreign Policy magazine, reporting that the US had completed a physical count of Pakistan's F-16s and found none missing. A report by the Washington Post noted that the Pentagon and State Department refused public comment on the matter but did not deny the earlier report.

Turkey

The Turkish Air Force acquired its first F-16s in 1987.  F-16s were later produced in Turkey under four phases of Peace Onyx programs. In 2015, they were upgraded to Block 50/52+ with CCIP by Turkish Aerospace Industries. Turkish F-16s are being fitted with indigenous AESA radars and EW suite called SPEWS-II.

On 18 June 1992, a Greek Mirage F-1 crashed during a dogfight with a Turkish F-16. On 8 February 1995, a Turkish F-16 crashed into the Aegean sea after being intercepted by Greek Mirage F1 fighters.

Turkish F-16s participated in the Bosnia Herzegovina and Kosovo since 1993 in support of United Nations resolutions.

On 8 October 1996, seven months after the escalation a Greek Mirage 2000 reportedly fired an R.550 Magic II missile and shot down a Turkish F-16D over the Aegean Sea. The Turkish pilot died, while the co-pilot ejected and was rescued by Greek forces. In August 2012, after the downing of a RF-4E on the Syrian Coast, Turkish Defence Minister İsmet Yılmaz confirmed that the Turkish F-16D was shot down by a Greek Mirage 2000 with an R.550 Magic II in 1996 near Chios island. Greece denies that the F-16 was shot down. Both Mirage 2000 pilots reported that the F-16 caught fire and they saw one parachute.

On 23 May 2006, two Greek F-16s intercepted a Turkish RF-4 reconnaissance aircraft and two F-16 escorts off the coast of the Greek island of Karpathos, within the Athens FIR. A mock dogfight ensued between the two sides, resulting in a midair collision between a Turkish F-16 and a Greek F-16. The Turkish pilot ejected safely, but the Greek pilot died owing to damage caused by the collision. 

Turkey used its F-16s extensively in its conflict with Kurdish insurgents in southeastern parts of Turkey and Iraq. Turkey launched its first cross-border raid on 16 December 2007, a prelude to the 2008 Turkish incursion into northern Iraq, involving 50 fighters before Operation Sun. This was the first time Turkey had mounted a night-bombing operation on a massive scale, and also the largest operation conducted by the Turkish Air Force.

During the Syrian Civil War, Turkish F-16s were tasked with airspace protection on the Syrian border. After the RF-4 downing in June 2012 Turkey changed its rules of engagement against Syrian aircraft, resulting in scrambles and downings of Syrian combat aircraft. On 16 September 2013, a Turkish Air Force F-16 shot down a Syrian Arab Air Force Mil Mi-17 helicopter in near the Turkish border. On 23 March 2014, a Turkish Air Force F-16 shot down a Syrian Arab Air Force MiG-23 when it allegedly entered Turkish air space during a ground attack mission against Al Qaeda-linked insurgents. On 16 May 2015, Two Turkish Air Force F-16s shot down a Syrian Mohajer 4 UAV firing two AIM-9 missiles after it trespassed into Turkish airspace for 5 minutes. A Turkish Air Force F-16 shot down a Russian Air Force Sukhoi Su-24 on the Turkey-Syria border on 24 November 2015.

On 1 March 2020, two Syrian Sukhoi Su-24s were shot down by Turkish Air Force F-16s using air-to-air missiles over Syria's Idlib Governorate. All four pilots safely ejected. On 3 March 2020, a Syrian Arab Army Air Force L-39 combat trainer was shot down by a Turkish F-16 over Syria's Idlib province. The pilot died.

As a part of Turkish F-16 modernization program new air to air missiles are being developed and tested for the aircraft. GÖKTUĞ program led by TUBITAK SAGE has presented two types of air to air missiles named as Bozdogan (Merlin) and Gokdogan (Peregrine). While Bozdogan has been categorized as a Within Visual Range Air-to-Air Missile (WVRAAM), Gokdogan is a Beyond Visual Range Air-to-Air-Missile (BVRAAM). On 14 April 2021, first live test exercise of Bozdogan have successfully completed and the first batch of missiles are expected to be delivered throughout the same year to the Turkish Air Force.

Egypt
On 16 February 2015, Egyptian F-16s struck weapons caches and training camps of the Islamic State (ISIS) in Libya in retaliation for the murder of 21 Egyptian Coptic Christian construction workers by masked militants affiliated with ISIS. The air strikes killed 64 ISIS fighters, including three leaders in Derna and Sirte on the coast.

Others

The Royal Netherlands Air Force, Belgian Air Force, Royal Danish Air Force, Royal Norwegian Air Force, and Venezuela Air Force have flown the F-16 on combat missions.

A Yugoslavian MiG-29 was shot down by a Dutch F-16AM during the Kosovo War in 1999. Belgian and Danish F-16s also participated in joint operations over Kosovo during the war. Dutch, Belgian, Danish, and Norwegian F-16s were deployed during the 2011 intervention in Libya and in Afghanistan. In Libya, Norwegian F-16s dropped almost 550 bombs and flew 596 missions, some 17% of the total strike missions including the bombing of Muammar Gaddafi's headquarters.

The Royal Moroccan Air Force and the Royal Bahraini Air Force each lost a single F-16C, both shot down by Houthis anti aircraft fire during the Saudi Arabian-led intervention in Yemen, respectively on 11 May 2015 and on 30 December 2015.

In late March 2018, Croatia announced its intention to purchase 12 used Israeli F-16C/D "Barak"/"Brakeet" jets, pending U.S. approval. Acquiring these F-16s would allow Croatia to retire its aging MiG-21s.

On 11 July 2018, Slovakia's government approved the purchase of 14 F-16s Block 70/72 to replace its aging fleet of Soviet-made MiG-29s. A contract was signed on 12 December 2018 in Bratislava.

Variants

F-16 models are denoted by increasing block numbers to denote upgrades. The blocks cover both single- and two-seat versions. A variety of software, hardware, systems, weapons compatibility, and structural enhancements have been instituted over the years to gradually upgrade production models and retrofit delivered aircraft.

While many F-16s were produced according to these block designs, there have been many other variants with significant changes, usually because of modification programs. Other changes have resulted in role-specialization, such as the close air support and reconnaissance variants. Several models were also developed to test new technology. The F-16 design also inspired the design of other aircraft, which are considered derivatives. Older F-16s are being converted into QF-16 drone targets.

  The F-16A (single seat) and F-16B (two seat) were initial production variants. These variants include the Block 1, 5, 10, 15 and 20 versions. Block 15 was the first major change to the F-16 with larger horizontal stabilizers. It is the most numerous of all F-16 variants with 475 produced. Many F-16A and B aircraft have been upgraded to the Mid-Life Upgrade (MLU) Block 20 standard, becoming functionally equivalent to mid-production C/D models.

 F-16C/D The F-16C (single seat) and F-16D (two seat) variants entered production in 1984. The first C/D version was the Block 25 with improved cockpit avionics and radar which added all-weather capability with beyond-visual-range (BVR) AIM-7 and AIM-120 air-air missiles. Block 30/32, 40/42, and 50/52 were later C/D versions. The F-16C/D had a unit cost of US$18.8 million (1998). Operational cost per flight hour has been estimated at $7,000 to $22,470 or $24,000, depending on calculation method.

 F-16E/F The F-16E (single seat) and F-16F (two seat) are newer F-16 Block 60 variants based on the F-16C/D Block 50/52. The United Arab Emirates invested heavily in their development. They features improved AN/APG-80 active electronically scanned array (AESA) radar, avionics, conformal fuel tanks (CFTs), and the more powerful General Electric F110-GE-132 engine.

 F-16IN For the Indian MRCA competition for the Indian Air Force, Lockheed Martin offered the F-16IN Super Viper. The F-16IN is based on the F-16E/F Block 60 and features conformal fuel tanks; AN/APG-80 AESA radar, GE F110-GE-132A engine with FADEC controls; electronic warfare suite and Infra-red search and track (IRST) unit; updated glass cockpit; and a helmet-mounted cueing system. As of 2011, the F-16IN is no longer in the competition. In 2016, Lockheed Martin offered the new F-16 Block 70/72 version to India under the Make in India program. In 2016, Indian government offered to purchase 200 (potentially up to 300) fighters in a deal worth $13–15bn. As of 2017, Lockheed Martin has agreed to manufacture F-16 Block 70 fighters in India with the Indian defense firm Tata Advanced Systems Limited. The new production line could be used to build F-16s for India and for exports.

 F-16IQ In September 2010, the Defense Security Cooperation Agency informed the United States Congress of a possible Foreign Military Sale of 18 F-16IQ aircraft along with the associated equipment and services to the newly reformed Iraqi Air Force.

 F-16N The F-16N was an adversary aircraft operated by the United States Navy. It is based on the standard F-16C/D Block 30 and is powered by the General Electric F110-GE-100 engine, and is capable of supercruise. The F-16N has a strengthened wing and is capable of carrying an Air Combat Maneuvering Instrumentation (ACMI) pod on the starboard wingtip. Although the single-seat F-16Ns and twin-seat (T)F-16Ns are based on the early-production small-inlet Block 30 F-16C/D airframe, they retain the APG-66 radar of the F-16A/B. In addition, the aircraft's 20 mm cannon has been removed, as has the ASPJ, and they carry no missiles. Their EW fit consists of an ALR-69 radar warning receiver (RWR) and an ALE-40 chaff/flare dispenser. The F-16Ns and (T)F-16Ns have the standard Air Force tailhook and undercarriage and are not aircraft carrier capable. Production totaled 26 airframes, of which 22 are single-seat F-16Ns and four are twin-seat TF-16Ns. The initial batch of aircraft were in service between 1988 and 1998. At that time, hairline cracks were discovered in several bulkheads and the Navy did not have the resources to replace them, so the aircraft were eventually retired, with one aircraft sent to the collection of the National Naval Aviation Museum at NAS Pensacola, Florida, and the remainder placed in storage at Davis-Monthan AFB. These aircraft were later replaced by embargoed ex-Pakistani F-16s in 2003. The original inventory of F-16Ns were previously operated by adversary squadrons at NAS Oceana, Virginia; NAS Key West, Florida and the former NAS Miramar, California. The current F-16A/B aircraft are operated by the Naval Strike and Air Warfare Center at NAS Fallon, Nevada.

 F-16V At the 2012 Singapore Air Show, Lockheed Martin unveiled plans for the new F-16V variant with the V suffix for its Viper nickname. It features an AN/APG-83 active electronically scanned array (AESA) radar, a new mission computer and electronic warfare suite, automated ground collision avoidance system, and various cockpit improvements; this package is an option on current production F-16s and can be retrofitted to most in service F-16s. First flight took place 21 October 2015. Lockheed and AIDC both invested in the development of the aircraft and will share revenue from all sales and upgrades. Upgrades to Taiwan's F-16 fleet began in January 2017. The first country to confirm the purchase of 16 new F-16V Block 70/72 was Bahrain. Greece announced the upgrade of 84 F-16C/D Block 52+ and Block 52+ Advanced (Block 52M) to the latest V (Block 70/72) variant in October 2017. Slovakia announced on 11 July 2018 that it intends to purchase 14 F-16V Block 70/72 aircraft. Lockheed Martin has redesignated the F-16V Block 70 as the "F-21" in its offering for India's fighter requirement. Taiwan's Republic of China Air Force announced on 19 March 2019 that it formally requested the purchase of an additional 66 F-16V jets. The Trump administration approved the sale on 20 August 2019. On 14 August 2020, Lockheed Martin was awarded a US$62 billion contract by the US DoD that includes 66 new F-16s at US$8 billion for Taiwan.

 QF-16 In September 2013, Boeing and the U.S. Air Force tested an unmanned F-16, with two US Air Force pilots controlling the airplane from the ground as it flew from Tyndall AFB over the Gulf of Mexico.

Related developments
Vought Model 1600 Proposed naval variant
General Dynamics F-16XL 1980s technology demonstrator
General Dynamics NF-16D VISTA 1990s experimental fighter
Mitsubishi F-2 1990s Japanese multi-role fighter based on the F-16

Operators

By July 2010, there had been 4,500 F-16s delivered.

Former operators
 – Italian Air Force leased up to 30 F-16As and 4 F-16Bs from the USAF from 2001 until 2012.
 – Royal Norwegian Air Force on 6 January 2022, Norway announced that all F-16s had been retired.

Notable accidents and incidents

The F-16 has been involved in over 670 hull-loss accidents as of January 2020.
On 8 May 1975, while practicing a 9-g aerial display maneuver with the second YF-16 (tail number 72-1568) at Fort Worth, Texas, prior to being sent to the Paris Air Show, one of the main landing gears jammed. The test pilot, Neil Anderson, had to perform an emergency gear-up landing and chose to do so in the grass, hoping to minimize damage and to avoid injuring any observers. The aircraft was only slightly damaged, but because of the mishap the first prototype was sent to the Paris Air Show in its place.
On 15 November 1982, while on a training flight outside Kunsan Air Base in South Korea, USAF Captain Ted Harduvel died when he crashed inverted into a mountain ridge. In 1985, Harduvel's widow filed a lawsuit against General Dynamics claiming an electrical malfunction, not pilot error, as the cause; a jury awarded the plaintiff $3.4 million in damages. However, in 1989, the U.S. Court of Appeals ruled the contractor had immunity to lawsuits, overturning the previous judgment. The court remanded the case to the trial court "for entry of judgment in favor of General Dynamics". The accident and subsequent trial was the subject of the 1992 film Afterburn.
On 23 March 1994, during a joint Army-Air Force exercise at Pope AFB, North Carolina, F-16D (AF Serial No. 88-0171) of the 23d Fighter Wing / 74th Fighter Squadron was simulating an engine-out approach when it collided with a USAF C-130E. Both F-16 crew members ejected, but their aircraft, on full afterburner, continued on an arc towards Green Ramp and struck a USAF C-141 that was being boarded by US Army paratroopers. This accident resulted in 24 fatalities and at least 100 others injured. It has since been known as the "Green Ramp disaster".
On 15 September 2003, a USAF Thunderbirds F-16C crashed during an air show at Mountain Home AFB, Idaho. Captain Christopher Stricklin attempted a "split S" maneuver based on an incorrect mean-sea-level altitude of the airfield. Stricklin survived with only minor injuries; the aircraft was destroyed. USAF procedure for demonstration "Split-S" maneuvers was changed, requiring both pilots and controllers to use above-ground-level (AGL) altitudes.
On 26 January 2015, a Greek F-16D crashed while performing a NATO training exercise in Albacete, Spain. Both crew members and nine French soldiers on the ground died when it crashed in the flight-line, destroying or damaging two Italian AMXs, two French Alpha jets, and one French Mirage 2000.
On 7 July 2015, an F-16CJ collided with a Cessna 150M over Moncks Corner, South Carolina, U.S. The pilot of the F-16 ejected safely, but both people in the Cessna were killed.
 On 11 October 2018, an F-16 MLU from the 2nd Tactical Wing of the Belgian Air Component, on the apron at Florennes Air Station, was hit by a gun burst from a nearby F-16, whose cannon was fired inadvertently during maintenance. The aircraft caught fire and was burned to the ground, while two other F-16s were damaged and two maintenance personnel were treated for aural trauma.

 On 11 March 2020, a Pakistani F-16AM (Serial No. 92730) belonging to the No. 9 Squadron (Pakistan Air Force) crashed in the Shakarparian area of Islamabad during rehearsals for the Pakistan Day Parade. The plane crashed when the F-16 was executing an aerobatic loop. As a result, the pilot of the F-16, Wing Commander Noman Akram, who was also the Commanding Officer of the No. 9 Squadron "Griffins", lost his life. A board of inquiry ordered by the Pakistan Air Force later revealed that the pilot had every chance to eject but opted not to and tried his best to save the aircraft and avoid civilian casualties on the ground. Videos taken by locals on the ground show his F-16AM crashing into some woods. He was hailed a hero by Pakistanis while also gaining some attraction internationally.

Specifications (F-16C Block 50 and 52)

Notable appearances in media

See also

Footnotes

References

Notes

Bibliography

Aleshire, Peter. Eye of the Viper: The Making of an F-16 Pilot (Illustrated ed.).  Old Saybrook, Connecticut: Globe Pequot, 2005. .
Aronstein, David C. and Albert C. Piccirillo. The Lightweight Fighter Program: A Successful Approach to Fighter Technology Transition. Reston, VA: AIAA, 1996. .
Coram, Robert. Boyd: The Fighter Pilot Who Changed the Art of War. New York: Little, Brown, and Co., 2002. .
Darling, Kev. F-16 Fighting Falcon (Combat Legend). London: Airlife, 2003. .

Frawley, Gerard. The International Directory of Military Aircraft. Manly NSW, Australia: Aerospace Publications Pty Ltd, 2002. .
Hampton, Dan. Viper Pilot: the autobiography of one of America's most decorated F-16 combat pilots. William Morrow, 2012. 
Hoh, Roger H. and David G. Mitchell. "Flying Qualities of Relaxed Static Stability Aircraft – Volume I: Flying Qualities Airworthiness Assessment and Flight Testing of Augmented Aircraft." Federal Aviation Administration (DOT/FAA/CT-82/130-I), September 1983. Retrieved 16 June 2008.
Jenkins, Dennis R. F/A-18 Hornet: A Navy Success Story. New York: McGraw-Hill, 2000. .
Peacock, Lindsay. On Falcon Wings: The F-16 Story. RAF Fairford, United Kingdom: The Royal Air Force Benevolent Fund Enterprises, 1997. .
Richardson, Doug. General Dynamics F-16 Fighting Falcon. London: Salamander Books, 1990. .
Senior, Tim. The AirForces Monthly Book of the F-16 Fighting Falcon. Stamford, UK: Key Books Ltd, 2002. .
Spick, Mike, ed. Great Book of Modern Warplanes. St. Paul, MN: MBI, 2000. .

Further reading
Drendel, Lou. F-16 Fighting Falcon – Walk Around No. 1. Carrollton, Texas: Squadron/Signal Books, 1993. .
 Gunston, Bill. United States Military Aircraft of the 20th century London: Salamander Books Ltd, 1984. .
Jenkins, Dennis R. McDonnell Douglas F-15 Eagle, Supreme Heavy-Weight Fighter. Arlington, Texas: Aerofax, 1998. .
 Sweetman, Bill. Supersonic Fighters: The F-16 Fighting Falcons. Mankato, Minnesota: Capstone Press, 2008. .
Williams, Anthony G. and Dr. Emmanuel Gustin. Flying Guns: The Modern Era. Ramsbury, UK: The Crowood Press, 2004. .

External links

 F-16 USAF fact sheet
 F-16 page on LockheedMartin.com and F-16 articles on Code One magazine site
 F-16.net Fighting Falcon resource

Mid-wing aircraft
F-016
F-016
1970s United States fighter aircraft
Single-engined jet aircraft
Relaxed-stability aircraft
 
Aircraft first flown in 1974
Fourth-generation jet fighter